This is a list of villages in Ambala district.

Jandheri

 Kurali
 Ahmadpur
 Akbarpur
 Ambli
 Andheri
 Azampur
 Badhauli
 Badi Kohri
 Bakarpur
 Baktuha
 Ballopur
 Banaundi
 Bapauli
 Bara Gaon
 Bara Korwa
 Baragarh
 Barheri 
 BadiBarheri 
 ChhotiBasi 
 BassiBari 
 Rasaur
 Baroli
 Barsu Majra
 Batora
 Behloli
 Ber Kheri
 Berpura
 Bharanpur
 Bharog
 Bheron
 Bibipur
 Bichpari
 Bilaspur
 Boron
 Brahman Majra
 Budha Khera
 Bukhari
 Burj Shahid
 Chand Sauli
 Chautan
 Chechi Majra
 Chhajal Majra
 Chhajju Majra
 Chhotagarh
 Chhoti Bassi
 Chhoti Kohri
 Chhoti Rasaur
 Danora
 Dehar
 Dehri
 Dera
 Dhamauli Bichli
 Dhamauli Majri
 Dhamauli Uparli
 Dhanana
 Dudhli
 Fatehpur
 Ferozepur
 Ferozepur Kathka
 Gadauli
 Ganauli
 Ganeshpur
 Gharauli
 Haldari
 Hamidpur
 Handi Khera
 Harbon
 Hassanpur
 Husaini
 Jagatpur
 Jangoo Majra
 Jangu Majra
 Jeoli
 Jhar Sahala
 Kakar Majra
 Kalal Majra
 Kalal Majri
 Kaleran
 Kalpi
 Kalyana
 Kanjala
 Karasan
 Kathe Majra
 Khanna Majra
 Khanpur Labana
 Khanpur Brahman
 Khanpur Rajputan
 Khera Jattan
 Kherki Manakpur
 Khirki Jatan
 Khurd
 Kohra Bhura
 Korwa Khurd
 Kullarpur
 Laha
 Lakhnaura
 Lalpur
 Loton
 Magharpura
 Majra
 Manakpur
 Manglor
 Mawa Kheri
 Mianpur
 Milk
 Mirpur
 Mirzapur Kath
 Mugal Majra
 Muna Majra
 Mukand Pur
 Nabipur
 Nagal
 Nagauli
 Nagla
 Nahoni
 Nakhrauli
 Nalvi
 Nanduwali
 Nanehra
 Nangawan
 Nasrauli
 NauGawan
 Nek Nawan
 Okhal
 Panjauri
 Panjeton
 Panjlasa
 Parail
 Patrehri
 Patwi
 Pulewala
 Rachheri
 Raiwali
 Rajawali
 Rajpura
 Raju Majra
 Ramgarh
 Rampur
 Rao Majra
 Rasidpur
 Rattanheri
 Rataur
 Rerh Viran
 Sadaqpur
 Salehpur
 Salola
 Sam Bhalva
 Sangrani
 Santokhi
 Shahpur
 Shahzadpur
 Shakarpura
 Sherpur
 Shiammru
 Sian Majra
 Sontli
 Surgal
 Tandwal
 Tanka Majra
 Tapparian Rulduki
 Tapri Shahid
 Tepla
 Thamber
 Toka
 Ujjhal Majri
 Wasalpur

See also
 Ambala District
 List of villages in India

Ambala
Villages
Ambala villages
Villages in Ambala
Lists of villages in Haryana